Osborn is an unincorporated community located in Oktibbeha County, Mississippi. Notable people include comedian Toby Turner and blues singer Tony Hollins.

History
In 1960, seven black men from Little Rock used a restroom at Weaver's Amoco in Osborn, where there was only one restroom, which was for whites only. They were arrested at Mayhew Junction in Lowndes county, and required to pay a $200 per person bond. According to the law, they each faced a maximum penalty of six months in jail and a fine of $500. The case was widely anticipated as the first test of the state's sit-in law, but was settled when the defendants unexpectedly pleaded guilty and paid a small fine in Starkville the next day.

References

Unincorporated communities in Oktibbeha County, Mississippi
Unincorporated communities in Mississippi